The 2011 Bandy World Championship was an edition of the top annual event in international men's bandy, held between January 23 and January 30, 2011, in Kazan, Russia.

11 countries participated in the 2011 championships: Finland, Kazakhstan, Norway, Russia, Sweden, the United States  (group A) and Belarus, Canada, Hungary, Latvia,  and the Netherlands (group B). Australia was supposed to participate but didn't come because of the floodings. At least five more countries wanted to come, but the tournament format at the time did not allow more than twelve teams. For the first time, Finland won the group stage. Russia became the world champion, with Finland second, and Sweden third.

Group A

Preliminary round

Finals

Group B

Preliminary round

Final tour

Qualifiers to Group A 2012 

The team that finished last in Group A and the winner in Group B met in a qualifying match for the vacant seat in the 2012 Bandy World Championship Group A.

References 

World Championship
2011 in Russian sport
2011
World Championship,2011
Sport in Kazan
2011,Bandy World Championship
January 2011 sports events in Russia